Plenary adoption is an alternate form of adoption which terminates the relationship between birth parent and child.

See also
 French nationality law
 History of French nationality

References

Adoption law
Adoption in France
Adoption in Japan